Catherine Mary Bakewell, Baroness Bakewell of Hardington Mandeville,  (born 7 March 1949), known as Cathy Bakewell, is a British politician who is a Liberal Democrat member of the House of Lords and formerly an elected District Councillor for the Coker ward of South Somerset.

Early life and career
Bakewell was born Catherine Mary Green in Bristol in 1949. Bakewell joined the Liberal Party in 1974. She became the Yeovil Constituency Secretary and then went on to become to be an assistant to Yeovil Member of parliament Paddy Ashdown. Bakewell worked with Ashdown for twenty years eventually running the Leader's Office after the 1997 elections.

Bakewell was first elected to Somerset County Council in 1993, serving as Leader from 2001 to 2007, standing down in 2013. Bakewell was a member of the 2007 Councillors Commission which investigated the incentives and barriers to serving on Local Authorities.

Bakewell has served as a Liberal Democrat District Councillor for the Coker electoral ward in South Somerset since 2009.

On 9 September 2013, Bakewell was created a life peer as Baroness Bakewell of Hardington Mandeville, of Hardington Mandeville in the County of Somerset, taking her title for the local village of Hardington Mandeville where she lives. She made her maiden speech in the House of Lords that November during a debate on housing, the speech addressed affordable housing and the impact of the under-occupancy charge. She served as a director for the Leadership Centre for Local Government.

References

Living people
Life peeresses created by Elizabeth II
Liberal Democrats (UK) life peers
Members of the Order of the British Empire
1949 births
Place of birth missing (living people)
Politicians from Bristol
Councillors in Somerset
Liberal Democrats (UK) councillors
Leaders of local authorities of England
Women councillors in England